Qian Daosun 錢稻孫 (1887–1966) was a Chinese writer and interpreter.

Since 1900 Qian lived in Japan, where he studied in a French language school. Afterwards he also lived in Belgium and Italy, graduated from the University of Rome and returned to China in 1910. Qian Daosun was a close friend of Lu Xun and Xu Shoushang. Together with them, he co-authored the Twelve Symbols national emblem in 1912.  His renowned translations include the Inferno part of the Divine Comedy, Man'yōshū and The Tale of Genji.

Qian Daosun was a close friend of Lu Xun and Xu Shoushang (1983–1948). Together with them, he co-authored the Twelve Symbols national emblem in 1912. Since 1927, Qian taught Japanese in the Tsinghua University, where he obtained the professor's title in 1931, while also being the head of the university library.

References

1887 births
1966 deaths
Chinese literary critics
Modern Chinese poetry
Modernist writers
Republic of China essayists
Republic of China novelists
Republic of China poets
Academic staff of Tsinghua University
Writers from Huzhou
Educators from Huzhou
Poets from Zhejiang
Republic of China translators
People's Republic of China translators
Academic staff of Peking University
Presidents of Peking University
20th-century essayists
20th-century Chinese translators
19th-century Chinese translators
Chinese expatriates in Japan